Lando Mines is an unincorporated community in Mingo County, West Virginia, United States. Their post office  closed in December 1968.

References 

Unincorporated communities in West Virginia
Unincorporated communities in Mingo County, West Virginia
Coal towns in West Virginia